McKay v R, (1965) S.C.R. 798 is an early election law decision of the Supreme Court of Canada on the constitutionality of laws that limited the erection of election signs. The Court held that a municipal zoning regulation against signs on residential properties could not include federal election signs.  The reading down of the municipal by-law to not include Federal election signs evidences an early stage in the evolution of the Interjurisdictional immunity legal doctrine.

See also
 List of Supreme Court of Canada cases (Richards Court through Fauteux Court)

External links
 

Canadian federalism case law
Supreme Court of Canada cases
Supreme Court of Canada case articles without infoboxes
1965 in Canadian case law
Advertising and marketing controversies
Election law